Amydrium humile is a flowering plant in genus Amydrium of the arum family Araceae.

Distribution 
its native range is Peninsula Malaysia to Sumatra.

References 

Monsteroideae